The Molly Pitcher Stakes is an American Thoroughbred horse race raced annually during the last week of August at Monmouth Park in Oceanport, New Jersey.  The race is open to fillies and mares, age three and up, over one and one-sixteenth miles on the dirt.  This Grade III event currently carries a purse of $100,000.

The Molly Pitcher was reduced from a Grade II to a Grade III event in 2015 and had its purse lowered.

In 1951, the Molly Pitcher was the first race in the United States ever to be televised in color.

Records
Speed record:
 1:41.20 - Ambassador of Luck (1983)
 1:41.20 - Lady's Secret (1986)

Most wins:
 2 - Politely (1967, 1968)
 2 - Hystericalady (2007, 2008)

Most wins by a jockey:
 5 - Pat Day (1985, 1986, 1996, 1998, 2000)

Most wins by a trainer:
 6 - Todd A. Pletcher (2005, 2011, 2014, 2015, 2016, 2021)

Most wins by an owner:
 2 - Christiana Stables (1948, 1973)
 2 - Wheatley Stable (1955, 1966)
 2 - Bohemia Stable (1967, 1968)
 2 - H. Joseph Allen (1981, 1997)
 2 - Stephen D. Peskoff (1983, 1987)

Winners

References

 The 2008 Molly Pitcher Stakes at the NTRA

Graded stakes races in the United States
Horse races in New Jersey
Mile category horse races for fillies and mares
Monmouth Park Racetrack
Recurring sporting events established in 1946
1946 establishments in New Jersey